Adam Burkhammer is an American politician and pastor serving as a member of the West Virginia House of Delegates from the 46th district. Elected in November 2020, he assumed office on December 1, 2020.

Early life and education 
Burkhammer is a native of Buckhannon, West Virginia and graduated from Buckhannon-Upshur High School. He earned a bachelor's degree from the West Virginia Christian University in 2011.

Career 
Burkhammer is an associate pastor of the Cornerstone Community Church. Burkhammer and his wife, Jamie Burkhammer, have three children. He was elected to the West Virginia House of Delegates in November 2020 and assumed office on December 1, 2020.

References 

Living people
Republican Party members of the West Virginia House of Delegates
People from Buckhannon, West Virginia
Year of birth missing (living people)